The general election for mayor of Alexandria, Virginia, was held on November 2, 2021. Incumbent mayor Justin Wilson was elected to his first term in 2018, having defeated first-term incumbent Allison Silberberg in the Democratic primary. Wilson was challenged by Silberberg in 2021 but defeated her in the primary on June 8. Wilson faced Annetta Catchings, the first Republican to run for Mayor since 1994. Wilson defeated Catchings in the general election.

Democratic primary
The Democratic primary was held on June 8, 2021. Incumbent Mayor Justin Wilson defeated his predecessor, Allison Silberberg, in a rematch of the 2018 election.

Candidates

Declared
 Allison Silberberg - Mayor of Alexandria (2016−19)
 Justin Wilson - Incumbent mayor (2019−present)

Withdrew
 Mo Seifeldein - City councilman (2019−present)

Results

Republican nomination
The Republican party did not hold a primary. They selected Annetta Catchings as their nominee.

Candidates

Declared
 Annetta Catchings - Flight attendant

General election
The general election was held on November 2, 2021. Wilson defeated Annetta Catchings with over two-thirds of the vote.

References

External links
Official campaign websites
 Annetta Catchings (R) for Mayor
 Justin Wilson (D) for Mayor

2021
2021 United States mayoral elections
2021 Virginia elections